Gerald Myers (born August 5, 1936) is an American former college basketball coach. He was the head coach of the Texas Tech Red Raiders men's basketball team and the Houston Baptist Huskies men's basketball team and athletic director at Texas Tech University.

Early years
Originally from Borger, Texas, Myers played basketball for Texas Tech from 1956–1959. As a player, he had an 86.9 percent free throw shooting average for the 1957-58 season. He received a bachelor's degree in education from Texas Tech in 1959 and later earned a master's degree in 1965.

Career
Myers coached basketball for Monterey High School in Lubbock, Texas from 1962 through the 1966 season posting an impressive 92-18 record at the high school.

Houston Baptist
In 1967, Myers became the second head coach of the Houston Baptist Huskies men's basketball program.  Beginning with Myers' first season as head coach, the Huskies competed in the NCAA Division II after 4 seasons in the National Association of Intercollegiate Athletics. At the end of the 1969–70 season, Myers resigned to accept the position of assistant coach with the Texas Tech Red Raiders basketball program, where he played collegiality. In three seasons, Myers posted an overall record of 32–43.

Texas Tech
In 1970, Myers became an assistant coach for the Red Raiders before being named interim head coach following the resignation of Bob Bass only 13 games into the season.

He became head coach of the team during the 1970–71 basketball season and held this position for twenty years. Under Myers, the Red Raiders won two conference championships, five conference tournaments, and earned four trips to the NCAA Men's Division I Basketball Championship. Myers was named SWC Coach of the Year five times, winning the award more times than any other coach.

After resigning as head coach of the Red Raider basketball team, Myers became assistant athletic director at Texas Tech. In June 1996, Myers was named interim Athletic Director following the resignation of Bob Bockrath to take the same position at the University of Alabama. On February 17, 1997, Myers was announced as the university's permanent athletic director after being named sole finalist for the position. On August 26, 2010, Myers announced his retirement and was replaced by Kirby Hocutt on May 31, 2011.

Head coaching record

Source:

Notes

References 

1936 births
Living people
American men's basketball players
Basketball coaches from Texas
Basketball players from Texas
High school basketball coaches in the United States
Houston Christian Huskies men's basketball coaches
People from Borger, Texas
Texas Tech Red Raiders athletic directors
Texas Tech Red Raiders basketball coaches
Texas Tech Red Raiders basketball players